Moroccan Chronicles (French: Chroniques marocaines, Arabic:وقائع مغربية) is a 1999 Moroccan film directed by Moumen Smihi.

Synopsis 
In the old medina of Fez, a mother narrates three tales to her son; the first one is about a Jemaa El Fna monkey trainer and three boys. The second, a love encounter between a young man and woman in Essaouira. Then comes the story of an old fisherman from Tangier who is ridiculed by his companions for believing he can find a treasure in the insides of a sea monster.

Cast 

 Aicha Mahmah
 Tarik Jamil
 Miloud Habachi
 Soumaïa Akâboune
 Mohamed Timod

References

External links 

Moroccan drama films
1999 films